Ōta Sukeyoshi may refer to:

 Ōta Sukeyoshi (I) (1739–1805), daimyō of Kakegawa Domain
 Ōta Sukeyoshi (II) (1854–1913), daimyō of Kakegawa Domain